Kong Cho Ha (born 15 September 1950) is a Malaysian politician. He served as the Minister of Transport from 4 June 2010 to 5 May 2013. He was the Member of Parliament of Malaysia for the Lumut constituency in Perak from 29 November 1999 to 5 May 2013. He is a member of the Malaysian Chinese Association (MCA) and had served as its secretary-general from 7 April 2010 to 2 January 2014.

Kong became a deputy minister after the 2004 general elections. In April 2009, he replaced Ong Ka Chuan as Minister of Housing and Local Government. In June 2010, he moved to the Transport portfolio, replacing Ong Tee Keat.

During the MCA party Central Committee re-election in 2010, he partnered with Chua Soi Lek to contest for Deputy Presidency (Chua contested for presidency). However he was defeated by Liow Tiong Lai who was Ong Ka Ting's partner. He was later appointed by Dr Chua, the new president, as the party's Secretary-General. He was replaced by Ong Ka Chuan who was picked by Liow to become secretary-general again the second time on 2 January 2014.

Election results

Honours

Honours of Malaysia
  :
  Medal of the Order of the Defender of the Realm (PPN) (1996)
  Member of the Order of the Defender of the Realm (AMN) (2001)
  Commander of the Order of Loyalty to the Crown of Malaysia (PSM) - Tan Sri (2014)
  :
  Knight Commander of the Order of the Perak State Crown (DPMP) - Dato' (2004)
  Knight Grand Commander of the Order of the Perak State Crown (SPMP) - Dato' Seri (2009)
  :
  Grand Knight of the Order of Sultan Ahmad Shah of Pahang (SSAP) - Dato' Sri (2011)

References

 

Living people
Members of the Dewan Rakyat
Malaysian politicians of Chinese descent
Medallists of the Order of the Defender of the Realm
Members of the Order of the Defender of the Realm
Government ministers of Malaysia
1950 births
People from Perak
Malaysian Chinese Association politicians
Commanders of the Order of Loyalty to the Crown of Malaysia
Transport ministers of Malaysia